David Vincent Taylor (born February 17, 1972) is an American politician of the Republican Party. He was a member of the Washington House of Representatives, representing the 15th district.

Awards 
 2014 Guardians of Small Business award. Presented by NFIB.

References

External links 
 David Taylor at ballotpedia.org

1972 births
Living people
21st-century American politicians
Republican Party members of the Washington House of Representatives
People from Ellensburg, Washington
People from Yakima County, Washington